Taipei Zoo South Station is a station on the Maokong Gondola located in Wenshan District, Taipei, Taiwan.

See also 
 Taipei Zoo

Railway stations opened in 2007
Maokong Gondola stations
South Station